Izuus nakamurai is an extinct prehistoric damselfish from the Izu Peninsula, Early Miocene Japan.

See also

 Prehistoric fish
 List of prehistoric bony fish

References 

Prehistoric perciform genera
Miocene fish
Pomacentridae
Fossil taxa described in 1938
Fossils of Japan